"Skip to the Good Bit" is a song by English hip hop duo Rizzle Kicks. The song was released as a digital download in the United Kingdom on 25 October 2013 as the second single from their second studio album, Roaring 20s (2013). The song features uncredited vocals from Emily Phillips, who also co-wrote the song.

Written by Jordan Stephens, Harley Alexander-Sule, Ant Whiting and Phillips, the song peaked at number 16 on the UK Singles Chart. It also interpolates and uses the melody of the song "Unbelievable" by EMF. In 2013, the song was used in an advert for Strictly Come Dancing, and also played over the end credits of the film adaption of Gangsta Granny.

Music video
A music video to accompany the release of "Skip to the Good Bit" was first released onto YouTube on 9 October 2013 at a total length of four minutes and five seconds. The music video is set in a school where the duo play students in a science class. After the teacher leaves with one of the female teachers and makes out with her in a cupboard and are caught out by the janitors, the duo make a love potion which the other students drink and causes them to start kissing each other. The duo then leave the classroom and go off to the staff room where an end of term party is being held and they spike the punch with the potion and the guests drink and dance along to the song. The duo also play other characters in the video, Jordan plays the science teacher whilst Harley plays one of the school's janitors alongside British actor Will Poulter.  The video also features Irish TV presenter Laura Whitmore  and actress Gemma Atkinson as guests at the party.

Track listing

Credits and personnel
 Lead vocals – Rizzle Kicks
 Lyrics – Jordan Stephens, Harley Alexander-Sule, Ant Whiting, Emily Phillips
 Producers – Ant Whiting
 Labels – Universal Island

Charts

Release history

References

2013 singles
Rizzle Kicks songs
Song recordings produced by Ant Whiting
Songs written by Ant Whiting